Borzestowski (masculine) or Borzestowska (feminine) may refer to
Donnie Borzestowski, the drummer of the Australian indie rock group Gang of Youths
Marek Borzestowski, a founder of  the group of companies Wirtualna Polska 
Szymon (musician) (Szymon Josiah Borzestowski, 1989–2012), Australian musician
Borzestowska Huta, a village in Poland